Jen McGowan is an American filmmaker. At the 2014 South by Southwest Film Festival, McGowan won the Gamechanger Award for Kelly & Cal, her first feature film.  McGowan is the creator of filmpowered.com, an international skill-sharing, networking and job resource for professional women in film and television. She is an honorary member of the Alliance of Women Directors.

Career
Jen McGowan began her career as a filmmaker in 1997 when she received her BFA from NYU’s Tisch School of the Arts. There she studied film and trained as an actor at the Atlantic Theater Company with David Mamet, William H. Macy, and Sam Shepard. During this period, McGowan worked with New York companies such as RSA/Black Dog, A Band Apart, Killer Films, and Propaganda. She worked on  independent feature films, including the Oscar-winning Boys Don't Cry.

McGowan received a grant from The Caucus Foundation for her thesis film, Confessions of a Late Bloomer, which began its festival run at the Tribeca Film Festival.

McGowan then directed the short film Touch, which won the Grand Jury Award for Best Narrative Short at the 2010 Florida Film Festival. McGowan began development on Kelly & Cal, her feature directorial debut, through the First Team project at USC, which fostered projects for their alumni.

She is a member of the Los Angeles chapter of Film Fatales and a Film Independent Fellow.

Kelly & Cal
Kelly & Cal stars Juliette Lewis, Jonny Weston, Cybill Shepherd, Margaret Colin and Josh Hopkins, and premiered at the SXSW Film Festival in Austin, Texas, in March 2014. The film tells the story of a riot grrrl turned housewife (Lewis) who strikes up an unlikely friendship with her 17-year-old neighbor (Weston).  The film opened at SXSW to positive reviews from Variety, The Wrap and other sites. It made best of the fest lists with Vogue and Variety. Senior writer Karen Valby at Entertainment Weekly compared Kelly & Cal to the work of filmmakers Nicole Holofcener and Alexander Payne.

Glass Elevator 
Glass Elevator (as Film Powered) was founded by McGowan, who explained, "I wanted to get to know more women so I could hire more women."

In 2019, production studio Level Forward announced that it had acquired a 50% stake in the site and at Sundance 2019, it was announced that FilmPowered was changing its name to Glass Elevator.

, Glass Elevator hosts a network of over 3,000 vetted women.

Awards

 SXSW Gamechanger Award
 Boulder International Film Festival Best New Filmmaker Award
 The Caucus Foundation for Television Producers, Writers and Directors Grant
 Alliance of Women Directors Breakout Star Award

Filmography

References

External links 
 
 

 "An Interview With Filmmaker Jen McGowan" in Film Racket
 "Understanding Actors: Interview with Director Jen McGowan of Kelly & Cal" in Moviemaker
 "Will Female Filmmakers Ever Get A Fair Shake At Oscars?" Elle

American women film directors
Film directors from California
Living people
American women film producers
Film producers from California
Year of birth missing (living people)
21st-century American women